Leliu Subdistrict is a subdistrict of Shunde District, Foshan, Guangdong, China. It lies in central of Shunde, with a resident population of 120,000 with its total area of 92 square kilometres.

References

Link
Official site of Leliu Government (Chinese Version)

Shunde District
Township-level divisions of Guangdong
Subdistricts of the People's Republic of China